Moses Anthony Wright (born December 23, 1998) is an American professional basketball player for the Zhejiang Golden Bulls of the Chinese Basketball Association (CBA). He played college basketball for the  Georgia Tech Yellow Jackets.

Early life and high school career
Wright grew up swimming and playing tennis. He did not play basketball until he was entering high school. Wright attended Enloe High School in Raleigh, North Carolina, where he played on the junior varsity team for his first two years. He competed for the Raleigh Hawks, a homeschool team, as a junior before making Enloe's varsity team in his senior season. He averaged 21.5 points, 13.5 rebounds and 1.5 blocks per game per game as a senior. He committed to playing college basketball for Georgia Tech. He was lightly recruited by NCAA Division I programs and not ranked by major recruiting services.

College career
Wright averaged 3.6 points and 3.4 rebounds per game in his freshman season at Georgia Tech. On March 12, 2019, he recorded a sophomore season-high 25 points and seven rebounds in a 78–71 loss to Notre Dame at the first round of the ACC tournament. As a sophomore, Wright averaged 6.7 points and 3.7 rebounds per game. On February 22, 2020, he posted a career-high 33 points and 10 rebounds in a 79–72 loss to Syracuse. In his junior season, he averaged 13 points and seven rebounds per game. On November 25, he registered 31 points and 20 rebounds in a 123–120 loss to Georgia State in quadruple overtime.

On March 8, 2021, Wright was named the ACC Player of the Year and first-team All-ACC for his senior season. He missed the NCAA tournament round of 64 game against Loyola Chicago after testing positive for COVID-19. As a senior, he averaged 17.4 points, 8 rebounds, 2.3 assists, 1.5 steals and 1.6 blocks per game. On March 28, 2021, Wright declared for the 2021 NBA draft.

Professional career
After going undrafted in the 2021 NBA draft, Wright joined the New Orleans Pelicans for the 2021 NBA Summer League and averaged 7.2 points, 4.4 rebounds and 1.4 blocks per game. On September 27, 2021, he signed with the Los Angeles Clippers. However, he was waived on October 14. On October 27, Wright signed with the Agua Caliente Clippers as an affiliate player. In 13 games, he averaged 13.5 points and 8.5 rebounds in 29.7 minutes.

On December 21, 2021, Wright signed a 10-day contract with the Los Angeles Clippers.

On December 31, 2021, Wright was reacquired and activated by the Agua Caliente Clippers of the NBA G League.

On February 24, 2022, Wright signed a two-way contract with the Dallas Mavericks.

On July 28, 2022, Wright signed with the Zhejiang Golden Bulls of the Chinese Basketball Association.

Career statistics

NBA

Regular season

|-
| style="text-align:left;"|
| style="text-align:left;"|L.A. Clippers
| 1 || 0 || 1.0 || – || – || – || .0 || 1.0 || .0 || .0 || .0
|-
| style="text-align:left;"|
| style="text-align:left;"|Dallas
| 3 || 0 || 4.3 || .250 || .000 || 1.000 || 1.0 || .3 || .0 || .3 || 1.7
|- class="sortbottom"
| style="text-align:center;" colspan="2"|Career
| 4 || 0 || 3.5 || .250 || .000 || 1.000 || .8 || .5 || .0 || .3 || 1.3

College

|-
| style="text-align:left;"| 2017–18
| style="text-align:left;"| Georgia Tech
| 25 || 10 || 16.6 || .307 || .065 || .543 || 3.4 || .7 || .6 || .5 || 3.6
|-
| style="text-align:left;"| 2018–19
| style="text-align:left;"| Georgia Tech
| 30 || 21 || 18.5 || .470 || .208 || .489 || 3.7 || .8 || .4 || .6 || 6.7
|-
| style="text-align:left;"| 2019–20
| style="text-align:left;"| Georgia Tech
| 31 || 31 || 30.4 || .530 || .241 || .617 || 7.0 || .9 || .6 || 1.1 || 13.0
|-
| style="text-align:left;"| 2020–21
| style="text-align:left;"| Georgia Tech
| 25 || 25 || 35.3 || .532 || .414 || .658 || 8.0 || 2.3 || 1.5 || 1.6 || 17.4
|- class="sortbottom"
| style="text-align:center;" colspan="2"| Career
| 111 || 87 || 25.2 || .492 || .230 || .604 || 5.5 || 1.1 || .8 || 1.0 || 10.2

Personal life
Wright's father, Gerald, died of a heart attack in January 2012 after developing a staph infection following years of health issues. His mother, Calla, is a former music teacher for the Wake County Public School System.

References

External links

Georgia Tech Yellow Jackets bio

1998 births
Living people
Agua Caliente Clippers players
American men's basketball players
Basketball players from Raleigh, North Carolina
Dallas Mavericks players
Georgia Tech Yellow Jackets men's basketball players
Los Angeles Clippers players
Power forwards (basketball)
Texas Legends players
Undrafted National Basketball Association players
William G. Enloe High School alumni